Crowl is an English surname. Notable people with this surname include:

 Bernie Crowl (1908–1998), American football player 
 Claude Crowl (1892–1915), Australian rules football player and soldier 
 Joe Crowl (1883–1915), Australian rules football player and soldier 
 Madam Crowl (1870), fictional character in Sheridan Le Fanu's short story "Madam Crowl's Ghost"
 Sid Crowl (1888–1971), English football player